Howell Creek is a stream in Howell and Oregon counties of southern Missouri. The stream is a tributary to the Warm Fork Spring River.

The stream headwaters arise in Howell County within the city of West Plains at the confluence of the North Fork and South Fork streams The stream flows to the southeast within the Howell Valley roughly parallel to U.S. Route 63 passing the community of Chapin. It turns to the east passing two miles north of the community of Brandsville and enters Oregon County. The stream meanders east to merge with Elk Creek to form the Warm Fork Spring River The Burlington Northern follows the stream out of West Plains leaving the stream valley approximately two miles northwest of Brandsville.

The stream was named for Josiah Howell, an early settler in the area who moved to the area from Tennessee in the 1840s.

See also
List of rivers of Missouri

References

Rivers of Howell County, Missouri
Rivers of Oregon County, Missouri
Rivers of Missouri